Noriko Harada (born 6 November 1972) is a Japanese softball player. She competed in the women's tournament at the 1996 Summer Olympics.

References

External links
 

1972 births
Living people
Japanese softball players
Olympic softball players of Japan
Softball players at the 1996 Summer Olympics
Sportspeople from Saitama Prefecture
Asian Games medalists in softball
Softball players at the 1998 Asian Games
Medalists at the 1998 Asian Games
Asian Games silver medalists for Japan
20th-century Japanese women